Mwesa may be,

Mwesa language, Gabon
Mwesa Isaiah Mapoma